Monroe Township is a township in Wayne County, Iowa, USA.

History
Monroe Township is named after James Monroe.

References

Townships in Wayne County, Iowa
Townships in Iowa